Following is a list of all Article III United States federal judges appointed by President Ulysses S. Grant during his presidency. In total Grant appointed 46 Article III federal judges, making him the first president to appoint more federal judges than George Washington. Grant's appointments included 4 Justices to the Supreme Court of the United States, 10 judges to the United States circuit courts, and 32 judges to the United States district courts. Grant also appointed Edwin M. Stanton to the Supreme Court in 1869; Stanton was confirmed and his commission was issued, but died before he could accept his commission and take his seat.

Grant appointed 2 judges to the United States Court of Claims, an Article I tribunal.

United States Supreme Court justices

Circuit courts

District courts

Specialty courts (Article I)

United States Court of Claims

Notes

Renominations

References
General

 

Specific

Sources
 Federal Judicial Center

Judicial appointments
Grant